Petr Benčík (born 29 January 1976 in Česká Lípa) is a retired Czech professional road cyclist. He represented his nation Czech Republic at the 2008 Summer Olympics, and also claimed three sporting titles in men's road race at the national championships as a full-fledged member of the Czech cycling team.

Bencik made his professional cycling debut in 2000 for the team Wüstenrot ZVVZ. Throughout his career, he captured numerous cup titles in both national and global road cycling tournaments, including his tremendous triumph from the 2006 Memoriał Henryka Łasaka in Poland.

Riding for  pro cycling team since 2006, Bencik qualified for the Czech squad, as a 32-year-old, in the men's road race at the 2008 Summer Olympics in Beijing by receiving one half of the nation's two berths from UCI Europe Tour, along with his teammate Roman Kreuziger. He successfully completed a grueling race with a seventy-fifth-place finish through a vast field of nearly a hundred cyclists in 6:39:42. Bencik's official result was later elevated to seventy-fourth position, when Italy's Davide Rebellin had tested positive for CERA that consequently stripped off his Olympic silver medal.

Career highlights

1996 
 3rd Czech Championships (Road)
1998
 1st Overall Olympik Trnava, Slovakia
 1st Stage 1
2000
 3rd Prologue Tour de Beauce, Quebec (CAN)
 2nd Stage 10 Herald Sun Tour, Apollo Bay, Victoria (AUS)
 2nd Stage 11 Herald Sun Tour, Geelong, Victoria (AUS)
2003
 3rd Stage 3 Tour de Beauce, Quebec (CAN)
2004
 2nd Czech Championships (Road), Brno (CZE)
 2nd Memoriał Henryka Łasaka, Poland
2006
 1st Memoriał Henryka Łasaka, Poland
2007
 3rd Overall Tour du Loir-et-Cher 'Edmond-Provost', Vendôme (FRA)
 3rd Stage 3
 3rd Czech Championships (Road)
 3rd Friedens und Freundschaftstour, Austria
 1st Stage 1, Bad Leonfelden
2008
 1st Czech Championships (Road)
 74th Olympic Games, Beijing (CHN)
2010
 1st Czech Championships (Road)
 8th Overall Tour of Austria, Austria
2011
 1st Czech Championships (Road)
 1st Overall Tour of Austria, Austria
 1st Stage 1, Traun
 9th Czech Cycling Tour, Czech Republic
 8th Coupe des Carpathes, Poland

References

External links
NBC 2008 Olympics profile

Petr Bencik Colnago shop in Prague

1976 births
Living people
Czech male cyclists
Cyclists at the 2008 Summer Olympics
Olympic cyclists of the Czech Republic
People from Česká Lípa
Sportspeople from the Liberec Region